Ciureşti may refer to several villages in Romania:

 Ciureşti, a village in Vedea Commune, Argeș County
 Ciureşti and Ciureştii Noi, villages in Bălăşesti Commune, Galați County
 Ciureşti, a village in Corbu Commune, Olt County